The men's long jump event at the 1965 Summer Universiade was held at the People's Stadium in Budapest on 27 and 28 August 1965.

Medalists

Results

Qualification
Qualification mark: 7.00 metres

Final

References

Athletics at the 1965 Summer Universiade
1965